Adriaan "André" Rasenberg (June 17, 1914 – December 24, 1994) was a Dutch boxer who competed in the 1936 Summer Olympics.

He was born in Oosterhout and died in Breda.

In 1936 he was eliminated in the first round of the lightweight class after losing his fight to Kosta Hakim.

External links
profile

1914 births
1994 deaths
Lightweight boxers
Olympic boxers of the Netherlands
Boxers at the 1936 Summer Olympics
People from Oosterhout
Sportspeople from North Brabant
Dutch male boxers